101st meridian may refer to:

101st meridian east, a line of longitude east of the Greenwich Meridian
101st meridian west, a line of longitude west of the Greenwich Meridian